Alexander Hugh McDonald, FBA (15 May 1908 – 9 July 1979) was a New Zealand-born ancient historian and classicist whose career was spent in England and Australia.

Early life and education 
Born on 15 May 1908 in New Zealand, McDonald was the son of a Scottish Presbyterian minister. He attended Auckland Grammar School and then Auckland University College, graduating with a first-class degree in Latin and Greek. In 1930, he went to England to study classics at Clare College, Cambridge. He secured a first in part 2 of the Tripos and won an exhibition and research award, enabling him to complete a PhD on the Roman historian Livy, which was awarded by the University of Cambridge in 1936.

Academic career 
In 1934, McDonald was appointed to a lectureship in ancient history at Nottingham University College. He struck up friendships with F. W. Walbank (with whom he sometimes collaborated), Ulrich Kahrstedt, F. E. Adcock, Hugh Last and W. B. Anderson. Following the death of S. K. Johnson, he was invited to prepare an edition of books 31 to 40 of Livy's Ab Urbe Condita Libri for the Oxford Classical Texts series. McDonald moved to Australia in 1939 to become Reader in Ancient History at the University of Sydney; there, he was acting Professor of Latin in 1945 and that year was appointed the inaugural Professor of Ancient World History at the university. A highly regarded lecturer, McDonald was also a commentator in broadcasting, edited The Australian Outlook and authored works on Japanese imperialism and international relations in the Pacific region.

McDonald left Australia in 1952 to take up a lectureship in ancient history at the University of Cambridge and a fellowship at Clare College. This gave him more time to focus on his research; he published the OCT edition of Livy (books 31 to 35) in 1965, which was the first modern, critical edition of the work. He also authored Republican Rome (1966). Additional appointments followed: he was chair of the Archaeological Faculty at the British School at Rome from 1967 to 1970, president of the Cambridge Philological Society from 1968 to 1970 and president of the Society for the Promotion of Roman Studies from 1971 to 1974. He also received various honours, including two honorary doctorates, the DLitt from Cambridge, and election to the fellowship of the British Academy in 1967. He retired from his lectureship in 1973. In the 1970s, his health deteriorated and he was unable to complete the next five books of Livy for the OCT series (which he had been working on) before he died on 9 July 1979.

References 

1908 births
1979 deaths
New Zealand classical scholars
Historians of antiquity
University of Auckland alumni
Alumni of Clare College, Cambridge
Academics of the University of Nottingham
Academic staff of the University of Sydney
Academics of the University of Cambridge
Fellows of Clare College, Cambridge
Fellows of the British Academy
New Zealand expatriates in the United Kingdom
New Zealand expatriates in Australia
Presidents of The Roman Society